Zhang Jingyang (Chinese: 张靖洋; born 25 January 1989) is a Chinese football player who currently plays for Heilongjiang Ice City in the China League One.

Club career
In 2006, Zhang Jingyang started his professional footballer career with Harbin Yiteng in the China League Two. 
In February 2011, Sun transferred to China League Two side Fushun Xinye.
In January 2012, Sun transferred to Chinese Super League side Liaoning Whowin. He would eventually make his league debut for Liaoning on 10 March 2012 in a game against Henan Jianye.

On 24 January 2017, Zhang moved to League Two side Sichuan Longfor.

Club career statistics 
Statistics accurate as of match played 31 December 2020.

References

External links
 

1989 births
Living people
Chinese footballers
Footballers from Yunnan
Zhejiang Yiteng F.C. players
Liaoning F.C. players
Sichuan Longfor F.C. players
Chengdu Better City F.C. players
Chinese Super League players
China League One players
China League Two players
Association football midfielders